The Warren United Methodist Church and Parsonage are a Methodist church and house at 27 Church Street in the center of Warren, Rhode Island.  The church was started in 1789 under the Rev. Daniel Smith and was the first Methodist congregation in Rhode Island, and the second in all New England.  The building is a Greek Revival structure with a full temple front built in 1844 by Fall River, Massachusetts architect Perez Mason. The parsonage is a two-story Italianate structure built by the congregation in 1858. It was designed by the Warren firm of Hoar & Drown and built by the related firm of Hoar & Martin.

The two buildings were listed on the National Register of Historic Places in 1971.

See also
National Register of Historic Places listings in Bristol County, Rhode Island

References

External links
Church website

Churches completed in 1844
19th-century Methodist church buildings in the United States
Houses on the National Register of Historic Places in Rhode Island
Churches on the National Register of Historic Places in Rhode Island
United Methodist churches in Rhode Island
Warren, Rhode Island
Houses in Bristol County, Rhode Island
Churches in Bristol County, Rhode Island
National Register of Historic Places in Bristol County, Rhode Island
Historic district contributing properties in Rhode Island
1789 establishments in Rhode Island